Pauline Davis may refer to:

Pauline Davis-Thompson (born 1966), née Davis, Bahamian Olympic sprinter
Pauline Davis (politician) (1917–1995), U.S. politician
Pauline Davis (First lady) of First ladies of North Dakota
Pauline Davis (badminton), played in 1977 All England Open Badminton Championships

See also
Paulina Davis, American abolitionist, suffragist, and educator